The K League Young Player of the Year Award means the best player among under-23 K League players. This award has been awarded since the 1985 season, the third season in the K League.

K League 1 winners (1985–present)

Rookie of the Year (1985–2012)

Young Player of the Year (2013–present)

K League 2 winners (2020–present)

See also
 K League
 K League MVP Award
 K League Top Scorer Award
 K League Top Assist Provider Award
 K League Manager of the Year Award
 K League FANtastic Player
 K League Best XI
 K League Players' Player of the Year

External links
 All-time winners at K League 
 History at K League 

K League trophies and awards
1985 establishments in South Korea
Awards established in 1985
Annual events in South Korea
Association football young player of the year awards
Rookie player awards